Astafyevo is a rural locality (a village) in Vorshinskoye Rural Settlement, Sobinsky District, Vladimir Oblast, Russia. The population was 15 as of 2010.

Geography 
Astafyevo is located 27 km northeast of Sobinka (the district's administrative centre) by road. Yerosovo is the nearest rural locality.

References 

Rural localities in Sobinsky District